Karl-Heinz Thielen (born 2 April 1940) is a German former footballer who played as a striker or defender.

Club career 
Thielen spent ten seasons in the Bundesliga with 1. FC Köln. He played as right winger for 1. FC Köln, which was a founding member of the 1. Bundesliga in 1963. In his first year, he became German champion with the club, making 25 appearances and scoring 15 goals. In total, Thielen, who had also played for Köln in the Oberliga West from the 1959/60 season, made 221 Bundesliga appearances and scored 56 goals between 1963 and 1973. On 7 December 1963, he became the first of now 14 players to score five goals in a Bundesliga match in 1. FC Köln's 5-1 win against 1. FC Kaiserslautern.

He scored a goal in two games for the DFB's U-23 team in the early 1960s. He later also played twice for the senior national team: in the home games against the ČSSR (1964) and against England (1965), the West German team came off as losers in both cases.

International career 
He also represented West Germany in two friendlies.

Official Career
After finishing his active career, he became a soccer manager and played a role in the appointment of coach Hennes Weisweiler, with whom 1. FC Köln won the German Cup in 1976/77. In 1977/78, he won the double (German Champion/DDFB Cup Winner) with 1. FC Köln. He later served as treasurer, managing director and vice president. From 1989 to 1991, he was sports director at Fortuna Düsseldorf. At the end of 1992, he returned to the then relegation-threatened 1. FC Köln as manager until September 1993. In the same year, Köln became German indoor champions.

Thielen was elected president of the "Deutsche Fußballspieler-Vermittler Vereinigung" (DFVV) at its founding meeting. He held this office until his retirement due to age on 2 April 2015.

As of February 2010, Thielen was a player agent and represents, among others, Liam Lawrence, Juan Carlos Menseguez and Facundo Hernán Quiroga.

Statistic

 1. Bundesliga
221 appearances; 56 goals

 Oberliga West
74 appearances; 44 goals

 Final round of the German championship
 18 appearances; 15 goals

 DFB-Pokal
 25 appearances; 6 goals

 Westpokal
 12 appearances; 8 goals

 UEFA Champions League; UEFA Cup Winners' Cup; UEFA Europa League
 45 appearances; 15 goals

Honours
 West German: 1962, 1964
 DFB-Pokal: 1968; runner-up: 1970, 1971 and 1973

References

External links
 
 

1940 births
Living people
German footballers
Association football defenders
Association football forwards
Germany international footballers
Germany under-21 international footballers
Bundesliga players
1. FC Köln players